Maud Pember Reeves (24 December 1865 – 13 September 1953) (born Magdalene Stuart Robison) was a suffragist, socialist, feminist, writer and member of the Fabian Society.  She spent most of her life in New Zealand and Britain.

Early life 
Reeves was born in Mudgee, New South Wales, Australia, to bank manager William Smoult Robison and his wife Mary, a literary and well-travelled relative of the Carr-Saunders family of Surrey. The family moved to Christchurch, New Zealand, an Anglican settlement founded on the colonizing principles of Edward Gibbon Wakefield in 1868. Maud, as she was always known, was one of the first pupils at the new Christchurch High School of girls.

Marriage and family 
Described as tall and striking, with a handsome face, full red lips, dark eyes, and brown hair, she met her husband, William Pember Reeves at a coming-out ball when she was nineteen. He was a journalist, politician, and son of a newspaper proprietor, who "grew up an Englishman." His vision for New Zealand was "no slums and no poverty". They married at Christchurch on 10 February 1885.

The Reeves's first child, William, lived only a few hours. Their daughter Amber Reeves was born in 1887 and their second daughter, Beryl, in 1889. In December 1895 their son Fabian was born. Fabian (1895–1917) was killed in the First World War, aged 21 and a Flight Lieutenant in the RNAS.

The family's household was unorthodox. In 1900 Reeves' favourite sister, Effie Lascelles, recently widowed, moved in with her two daughters. Reeves' daughter Amber remembered a house filled with children, relatives, servants, nursemaids, "frightful rows" in the nursery, and her mother too busy to pay much attention to children. The Reeves' marriage after the birth of Fabian was not intimate. William did not approve of birth control. H. G. Wells (who until his affair with Amber was a close friend) wrote that the tensions in their marriage were about money and birth control. When Amber, then a student at Cambridge, became pregnant by Wells (a public and political scandal), Reeves offended her daughter by suggesting an abortion.

Education, employment and suffrage 
In the early years of their marriage Reeves acted, assisted her mother-in-law in charitable works, and for three years was the editor of the weekly Canterbury Times, edited by her husband and owned by his father.

In 1889, Reeves took the first part of a BA in French, mathematics, and English at Canterbury College (founded in 1873). In 1890 the family moved to Wellington, where her husband had been a radical member of the house of representatives since 1887. Reeves' studies were abandoned for her duties as the wife of a minister and suffragism.

Reeves was converted to women's suffrage by Julius Vogel, a former prime minister and friend of her husband. She had been president and founder of the women's section of the Christchurch Liberal Association. Education, she believed, would both convince women of the need to vote and civilize national debate. Although never a temperance advocate, Reeves worked closely with Kate Sheppard, the Women's Christian Temperance Union's suffrage superintendent, and Ellen Ballance, the prime minister's wife, and she used her considerable charm to influence her husband's colleagues. In September 1893 New Zealand was the first country in the world to grant women the vote, and Reeves chaired the first public meeting of enfranchised women in Christchurch on 11 October.

Fabian Women's Group 
In 1896 the family moved to London after her husband's appointment as Agent-General, the representative of New Zealand government within the British Empire. There, the couple became friends with a number of left-wing intellectuals, such as George Bernard Shaw, H. G. Wells, and Sidney and Beatrice Webb.

Reeves joined the Fabian Society in 1904, a precursor to the Labour Party, which promoted social reform, the Women's Liberal Association, and the executive of the National Union of Women's Suffrage Societies in 1906. At Reeves' instigation the Fabian Society's statement of its basic aims included a clause on equal citizenship in 1907, when she was elected, with Ethel Bentham and Marian Phillips, to the society's executive committee.

Reeves founded the Fabian Women's Group (FWG) with Charlotte Wilson in 1908. Held in Reeves' Brunswick Gardens drawing-room early in 1908, after a winter of suffrage agitation.  "the FWG intended both to give women more prominence in the Fabian Society and "to study women’s economic independence in relation to socialism." Member of the FWG included Beatrice Webb, Alice Clark, Edith Nesbit, Susan Lawrence, Margaret Bondfield, and Marion Phillips.

Round About a Pound a Week (1913) 
Initiated by Reeves in 1909, the FWG's Motherhood Special Fund Committee began a study of the domestic lives of families with new babies living on a subsistence wage of about a pound a week. The FWG had raised money and was able to give each mother extra cash for her children's food for their first year of life. The Fabians expected that the extra money would improve infant health and survival statistics for the sample group, which it definitely did—demonstrating that high child death rates in slum areas were caused by poverty and not maternal ignorance or negligence.

The Lambeth mothers' project was prompted by the recognition that more infants died in the London slums than in Kensington or Hampstead. It asked 'How does a working man's wife bring up a family on 20s a week?'. Forty-two families were selected from a lying-in hospital in Lambeth, London, to have weekly visits, medical examinations from Dr Ethel Bentham every two weeks, and 5s. to be paid to the mother for extra nourishment for three months before the birth of the baby and for one year afterwards. The mothers wrote down their weekly expenditure. Eight families withdrew because the husbands objected to this weekly scrutiny. Eight other mothers who could not read or write dictated their sums to their husbands or children. The verbatim accounts of the 'maternal manner of recollecting'—'Mr. G's wages was 19 bob out of that e took thruppons for es diner witch is not mutch e bein sutch an arty man'—is one of the features of the book which is in part an ironic comment on class relations: Lambeth women, familiar with the habits of educated visitors, politely anticipated sitting in draughts, listening to the gospel of porridge, and being advised against marriage.

The conclusions from the project were first published in 1912 as a Fabian Tract and later became Reeves' Round about a Pound a Week (1913). Poverty, the book argued, and neither maternal ignorance nor degeneration, caused ill health and high mortality. Had the children of Lambeth been 'well housed, well fed, well clothed and well tended from birth' who knows what they would have become. Fabian women were would-be lawmakers. The state must cast off its 'masculine' guise and 'co-parent'. The individual not the family should be the economic unit, and the state should pay family endowment, train midwives, make burial 'a free and honourable public service', introduce a legal minimum wage, and build clean, light, roomy buildings at economic rents for the working classes. If socialism should address the needs of working mothers then women themselves must want more: 'If people living on £1 a week had lively imaginations, their lives, and perhaps the face of England, would be different.'

Round about a Pound a Week is available via archive.org and was reprinted in 2008 by Persephone Books. Persephone's online description of the text states:The reason the book remains unique is its mixture of factual rigour, wit and polemic. As Polly Toynbee points out in her new Persephone Preface, one of the most shocking facts to emerge is that 'the Fabian women deliberately avoided the poorest families… because they wanted to show how the general standard of living among ordinary manual workers was below a level which could support good health or nutrition.'  Yet the book is consistently on the side of the mothers; without being in any sense do-gooding it explains 'to a middle-class world of power and condescension'  that they could not do better than they were doing on the tiny house-keeping allowance that their husbands were able to give them. And it is about far more than how the women of Lambeth 'managed'.  It is full of the kind of human detail that is usually only found in a novel. Polly Toynbee ends her preface by asking what Maud Pember Reeves would think nowadays. She concludes that she would be proud of the NHS and the welfare state but that she would be perplexed that the inequalities between rich and poor are still so enormous.

Later life and death 
In March 1917 Reeves was appointed director of women's services in the Ministry of Food. Following the death of her son Fabian in June 1917 from wounds sustained during service in the First World War, Reeves turned privately to spiritualism, and later to Higher Thought.

From the early 1920s her participation in public life declined. She travelled to New Zealand with William in 1925, but while she had conversed with the London poor she had never met a Maori.

She was a conscientious grandmother, her grandchildren included architect Margaret Justin Blanco White and Thomas Blanco White. She nursed both William and her sister through their final illnesses. Amber described her mother as "serious-minded" and "obviously chaste to the last degree". Her focus on the needs of others was as austere as her prose, but the unflinching eye for detail and clamour of voices in Round about a Pound a Week dramatized both the "almost intolerable conditions" of women's daily lives and Fabian feminism's response.

After twenty-one years as a widow, having lived with her sister Effie in Cambridge, Reeves died in a nursing home at 27 Powis Gardens, Golders Green, Middlesex, on 13 September 1953.

See also 
First-wave feminism

References

Further reading
 Fry, Ruth. Maud and Amber: a New Zealand Mother and Daughter and the Women’s Cause, 1865–1981. Christchurch, NZ:  Canterbury University Press, 1992. 
 Reeves, M.S. Round About a Pound a Week. New York: Garland Pub., 1980. 
 Lambeth notebooks used by Maud Pember Reeves as the raw material for "Round about a pound a week"
 Some of the text is available  here
 Author Profile at Persephone Books

1865 births
1953 deaths
New Zealand feminists
Members of the Fabian Society
New Zealand socialist feminists
Australian emigrants to New Zealand
People from Mudgee
19th-century New Zealand women
20th-century New Zealand women
Maud